Micromonospora chokoriensis is an endophytic actinomycete first isolated from sandy soil in Bangladesh; it produces single, non-motile nodular spore surfaces.

References

Further reading
Carro, Lorena, et al. "Diversity of Micromonospora strains isolated from nitrogen fixing nodules and rhizosphere of Pisum sativum analyzed by multilocus sequence analysis." Systematic and Applied Microbiology 35.2 (2012): 73–80.

External links

LPSN
Type strain of Micromonospora chokoriensis at BacDive -  the Bacterial Diversity Metadatabase

Micromonosporaceae
Bacteria described in 2007